James Jay "J." Knutson (born about 1957) is a Canadian folk singer-songwriter, and a founding member of the Celtic rock band Spirit of the West. He is normally credited as simply J. Knutson.

Early life and education
Knutson attended the British Columbia Institute of Technology, graduating in journalism.

Career
Knutson, along with Geoffrey Kelly and John Mann, formed a band called Eavesdropper in 1983 and began playing in pubs in Vancouver. The band was renamed Spirit of the West in 1985, and released a self-titled album that year. Knutson recorded with the group until the release of their second album, Tripping Up the Stairs,  but left after festival performances and a tour of western Canada in 1987.

He later performed both as a solo artist and as a supporting musician for Connie Kaldor, Ferron, Daniel Lavoie and Hart-Rouge. He also worked for CKO, CBC Radio One and CFUN in Vancouver.

From 1998 to 2016 he was one of the two artistic directors of a youth music group called the North Shore Celtic Ensemble, with whom he helped to record seven CDs. 

He also taught alongside Mike Hayden at Simon Fraser University in a Physics course called "Logarithm and Blues".

In 2017 he released a solo album, The Rite of Balance. He is currently the lead vocalist for Early Spirit, a Vancouver-based contemporary folk music band.

Discography

 The Last Family (1995)
 The Last Family Album (1996)
 Through These Windows (1998)
 Thesis (2001)
 Just J. Live @ The Sugar Suite (2006)
 1857 (un amour, une histoire) (2007)
 The Rite of Balance (2017)

References

External links
 Canoe Songs
 North Shore Celtic Ensemble
Early Spirit

Living people
Canadian male singer-songwriters
Canadian folk singer-songwriters
Canadian radio personalities
British Columbia Institute of Technology alumni
Spirit of the West members
Year of birth missing (living people)